In atomic physics, the Rydberg formula calculates the wavelengths of a spectral line in many chemical elements. The formula was primarily presented as a generalization of the Balmer series for all atomic electron transitions of hydrogen. It was first empirically stated in 1888 by the Swedish physicist Johannes Rydberg, then theoretically by Niels Bohr in 1913, who used a primitive form of quantum mechanics. The formula directly generalizes the equations used to calculate the wavelengths of the hydrogen spectral series.

History 
In 1880, Rydberg worked on a formula describing the relation between the wavelengths in spectral lines of alkali metals. He noticed that lines came in series and he found that he could simplify his calculations using the wavenumber (the number of waves occupying the unit length, equal to 1/λ, the inverse of the wavelength) as his unit of measurement. He plotted the wavenumbers (n) of successive lines in each series against consecutive integers which represented the order of the lines in that particular series. Finding that the resulting curves were similarly shaped, he sought a single function which could generate all of them, when appropriate constants were inserted.

First he tried the formula: , where n is the line's wavenumber, n0 is the series limit, m is the line's ordinal number in the series, m is a constant different for different series and C0 is a universal constant. This did not work very well.

Rydberg was trying:  when he became aware of Balmer's formula for the hydrogen spectrum  In this equation, m is an integer and h is a constant (not to be confused with the later Planck constant).

The term  was found to be a universal constant common to all elements, equal to 4/h. This constant is now known as the Rydberg constant, and m′ is known as the quantum defect.

As stressed by Niels Bohr, expressing results in terms of wavenumber, not wavelength, was the key to Rydberg's discovery. The fundamental role of wavenumbers was also emphasized by the Rydberg-Ritz combination principle of 1908. The fundamental reason for this lies in quantum mechanics. Light's wavenumber is proportional to frequency , and therefore also proportional to light's quantum energy E. Thus,  (in this formula the h represents Planck's constant). Modern understanding is that Rydberg's findings were a reflection of the underlying simplicity of the behavior of spectral lines, in terms of fixed (quantized) energy differences between electron orbitals in atoms. Rydberg's 1888 classical expression for the form of the spectral series was not accompanied by a physical explanation. Walther Ritz's pre-quantum 1908 explanation for the mechanism underlying the spectral series was that atomic electrons behaved like magnets and that the magnets could vibrate with respect to the atomic nucleus (at least temporarily) to produce electromagnetic radiation, but this theory was superseded in 1913 by Niels Bohr's model of the atom.

In Bohr's conception of the atom, the integer Rydberg (and Balmer) n numbers represent electron orbitals at different integral distances from the atom. A frequency (or spectral energy) emitted in a transition from n1 to n2 therefore represents the photon energy emitted or absorbed when an electron makes a jump from orbital 1 to orbital 2.

Later models found that the values for n1 and n2 corresponded to the principal quantum numbers of the two orbitals.

For hydrogen

where
 is the wavelength of electromagnetic radiation emitted in vacuum,
 is the principal quantum number of an energy level, and
 is the principal quantum number of an energy level for the atomic electron transition.
Note: Here, 

By setting  to 1 and letting  run from 2 to infinity, the spectral lines known as the Lyman series converging to 91 nm are obtained, in the same manner:

For any hydrogen-like element
The formula above can be extended for use with any hydrogen-like chemical elements with

where

 is the wavelength (in vacuum) of the light emitted,
 is the Rydberg constant for this element,
 is the atomic number, i.e. the number of protons in the atomic nucleus of this element,
 is the principal quantum number of the lower energy level, and
 is the principal quantum number of the higher energy level for the atomic electron transition.

This formula can be directly applied only to hydrogen-like, also called hydrogenic atoms of chemical elements, i.e. atoms with only one electron being affected by an effective nuclear charge (which is easily estimated). Examples would include He+, Li2+, Be3+ etc., where no other electrons exist in the atom.

But the Rydberg formula also provides correct wavelengths for distant electrons, where the effective nuclear charge can be estimated as the same as that for hydrogen, since all but one of the nuclear charges have been screened by other electrons, and the core of the atom has an effective positive charge of +1.

This is analogous to the Lyman-alpha line transition for hydrogen, and has the same frequency factor. Because the 2p electron is not screened by any other electrons in the atom from the nucleus, the nuclear charge is diminished only by the single remaining 1s electron, causing the system to be effectively a hydrogenic atom, but with a diminished nuclear charge Z − 1. Its frequency is thus the Lyman-alpha hydrogen frequency, increased by a factor of (Z − 1)2. This formula of f = c/λ = (Lyman-alpha frequency)⋅(Z − 1)2 is historically known as Moseley's law (having added a factor c to convert wavelength to frequency), and can be used to predict wavelengths of the Kα (K-alpha) X-ray spectral emission lines of chemical elements from aluminum to gold. See the biography of Henry Moseley for the historical importance of this law, which was derived empirically at about the same time it was explained by the Bohr model of the atom.

For other spectral transitions in multi-electron atoms, the Rydberg formula generally provides incorrect'' results, since the magnitude of the screening of inner electrons for outer-electron transitions is variable and not possible to compensate for in the simple manner above.  The correction to the Rydberg formula for these atoms is known as the quantum defect.

See also
 Balmer series
 Hydrogen line
 Rydberg–Ritz combination principle

References

 
 

Atomic physics
Foundational quantum physics
Hydrogen physics
History of physics